Rockfalls is a historic house at 7441 Rockfalls Drive in Richmond, Virginia.  Built in 1936–37, it is a locally prominent early example of International architecture, based on designs by Edward Durell Stone published in Collier's.  Its exterior is primarily granite and glass, the former probably quarried from a site on the grounds.  It exhibits classical International elements including a lack of adornment, emphasis on horizontality, and clean lines with some rounded surfaces.

The house was listed on the National Register of Historic Places in 2017.

See also
 National Register of Historic Places listings in Richmond, Virginia

References

Houses on the National Register of Historic Places in Virginia
Houses completed in 1937
National Register of Historic Places in Richmond, Virginia
International style architecture in Virginia
Houses in Richmond, Virginia